Unmasked is a 1917 dramatic silent film, one of several successes produced by Grace Cunard and Francis Ford. As was common with other female filmmakers of the time, Cunard co-wrote, co-starred and co-directed the film. A short 35 second clip is available on YouTube.

In 2014, Unmasked was selected to the United States National Film Registry as "culturally, historically or aesthetically significant".

References

External links
 

1917 films
1917 drama films
1910s English-language films
American silent short films
American black-and-white films
Silent American drama films
United States National Film Registry films
1910s American films